KF Pojani is an Albanian football club based in the small town of Pojan in the municipality of Maliq. They are currently not competing in the senior football league.

External links
Second Division Standings and Stats

Pojani
Maliq